The Embassy of Morocco in London is the diplomatic mission of Morocco in the United Kingdom. Morocco also maintains a Consulate at 97/99 Praed Street, Paddington.

Gallery

References

External links
Official site

Morocco
Diplomatic missions of Morocco
Morocco–United Kingdom relations
Buildings and structures in the City of Westminster
Buildings and structures in the Royal Borough of Kensington and Chelsea
South Kensington